Paul Brian Rodríguez Bravo (born 20 May 2000) is a Uruguayan professional footballer who plays as a winger for Liga MX club América and the Uruguay national team.

Club career

Peñarol
A youth academy product of Peñarol, Rodríguez made his professional debut on 28 March 2018 in a league match against Danubio. He came on as a 59th minute substitute for Giovanni González as the match eventually ended in a 1–1 draw. He scored his first goal on 24 May 2018 in a 3–0 league win against Boston River. He scored three goals from 26 matches in total before leaving the club in August 2019.

Los Angeles
On 7 August 2019, MLS club Los Angeles FC announced the signing of Rodríguez as a young designated player for a club record fee of $11.5 million. The transfer amount also made him the third-highest acquisition in MLS history at that time behind Atlanta United's Argentine duo Pity Martínez and Ezequiel Barco.

He made his club debut on 26 August 2019 in El Tráfico derby against LA Galaxy. He came on as a 61st minute substitute for Carlos Vela as the match eventually ended in a 3–3 draw.

Loan to Almería
On 1 February 2021, Rodríguez moved on loan to Segunda División side Almería. The deal gave Almería an option to make the deal permanent following his loan spell. On July 15, 2021, LAFC announced Rodríguez had returned to the MLS club.

Club América
On 24 August 2022, Rodríguez transferred to Liga MX side América for a reported $6 million transfer fee.

International career
Rodríguez is a current Uruguay international and was part of under-20 and under-17 teams in the past. He has represented his nation at the 2019 FIFA U-20 World Cup which took place at Poland, where he scored two goals and provided one assist from four matches.

In August 2019, he was called up to the senior team for first time to take part in friendlies against Costa Rica and USA. He made his international debut on 7 September 2019, playing whole 90 minutes in 2–1 win against Costa Rica. He scored his first international goal four days later in 1–1 draw against USA.

Career statistics

Club

International

International goals
Scores and results list Uruguay's goal tally first.

Honours
Los Angeles FC
Supporters' Shield: 2019

References

2000 births
Living people
People from Rivera Department
Uruguayan footballers
Uruguay international footballers
Peñarol players
Uruguayan Primera División players
Association football forwards
Los Angeles FC players
Designated Players (MLS)
Uruguayan expatriate footballers
Uruguayan expatriate sportspeople in the United States
Expatriate soccer players in the United States
Major League Soccer players
UD Almería players
2021 Copa América players
Uruguay under-20 international footballers
Club América footballers